David M. Malone, born in 1954, is a Canadian author on international security and development, as well as a career diplomat. He is a former president of the International Peace Institute, and a frequently quoted expert on international affairs, especially on Indian Foreign Policy and the work of the UN Security Council. He became president of the International Development Research Centre in 2008 and served until 2013. On 1 March 2013, he took up the position of UN Under-Secretary-General, Rector of the United Nations University, headquartered in Tokyo, Japan.

Education
David Malone is bilingual in French and in English and passed the French exam Baccalauréat in Ecole Saint Martin in Pontoise (France).He holds a degree from l’École des Hautes Études Commerciales (Montreal); studied at the American University in Cairo; holds an MPA from Harvard’s Kennedy School of Government; and earned a DPhil in International Relations from Oxford University.

Career

Diplomatic career
Malone served as a Canadian Ambassador to the UN from 1992 to 1994, after representing Canada on the UN's Economic and Social Council, 1990-92. He was appointed as the Canadian High Commissioner to India, and the non-resident Ambassador to Nepal and Bhutan, 2006-2008.

International Peace Institute
From 1998 until 2004, when Terje Rød-Larsen took over, he was the president of the International Peace Institute, then known as the International Peace Academy. He has spoken at the Carnegie Council for Ethics in International Affairs.

International Development Research Centre
Malone was president of the International Development Research Centre, a Canadian crown corporation that supports evidence-based and policy relevant research into healthier, more equitable, and more prosperous societies in the global south, 2008-2013, and became president in July 2008.

Haiti
Malone has a long-term interest in Haiti, which he visited as part of UN delegations and as a representative of human rights groups. His book Decision-Making in the UN Security Council: The Case of Haiti is "an account of the struggle to address the Haiti crisis from 1990 to 1998." A former supporter of president Jean-Bertrand Aristide, he was highly critical of the international pressure that resulted in Aristide's ousting, singling out the United States, France, and Canada in a 2004 op-ed piece published in the International Herald Tribune and The New York Times. In an interview with the Neue Zürcher Zeitung, he expressed mixed optimism that a lengthy (15 to 20 years) international involvement might bring about positive change, but lamented the lack of interest in "Paris, Washington, or even Ottawa" in a long-term strategy. In an op-ed piece in The New York Times written with Kirsti Samuels (also of the International Peace Institute) published in July 2004, he advocated an international commitment to long-term nation-building for Haiti.

India 
Malone has also focused extensively on India’s international relations.  He wrote a monograph, ‘Does the Elephant Dance? Contemporary Indian Foreign Policy’, Oxford University Press, 2011, and in 2015 co-edited a wide-ranging survey of Indian Foreign Policy , with C. Raja Mohan and Srinath Raghavan, comprising a wide range of essays for Oxford University Press on the same topic primarily written by Indian authors, including many young ones.  He is one of the foreign scholars most often cited on India's international relations.  He remains engaged with the topic.

United Nations University
Malone was appointed by the United Nations Secretary-General Ban Ki-moon as Rector of the United Nations University (UNU) in Tokyo on 3 October 2012. He took up this position on 1 March 2013, and will retired from it on February 28, 2023.  He published five books during his tenure, including ‘The Oxford Handbook of Higher Education in the Asia-Pacific Region’, co-edited with Devesh Kapur, Lily Kong and Florence Lo, comprising multiple chapters written primarily by authors from the region, to be published by Oxford University Press in November 2022.

Authorship
Malone has written a number of books, many of them concerned with the United Nations, international development, international security and Indian foreign policy.  He frequently published academic chapters and articles in scholarly volumes and journals.  As well, he writes regularly for the Literary Review of Canada. Earlier he had written on the political economy of civil wars, on the causes of violent conflict and conflict prevention, on Security Council decision-making, on Haiti and on Iraq.

Malone's The International Struggle Over Iraq: Politics in the UN Security Council 1980-2005 was nominated for the 2006-2007 Lionel Gelber Prize, an award given annually to the best book on international affairs.

Books authored and edited
 " The Law and Practice of the UN",2nd Ed., co-authored with Simon Chesterman and Ian Jonhstone (Oxford UP, 2016)
 " The Oxford Handbook on Indian Foreign Policy", co-edited with C. Raja Mohan and Srinath Raghavan (Oxford UP, 2015)
 " The UN Security Council in the 21st Century", co-edited with Sebastian von Einsiedel and Bruno Stagno Ugarte, (Lynne Rienner 2014)
 International Development: Ideas, Experience, and Prospects, co-edited with  Bruce Currie-Alder, Ravi Kanbur and Rohinton Medhora (Oxford UP, 2014) 
 Nepal in Transition: From Civil War to Fragile Peace, co-edited with Sebastian von Einsiedel and Suman Pradhan (Cambridge UP, 2012)
 Does the Elephant Dance? Contemporary Indian Foreign Policy (Oxford UP, 2011)
 The Law and Practice of the United Nations, co-authored by Simon Chesterman and Thomas M. Franck (Oxford UP, 2008)
 Preventing a Future Generation of Conflict in Iraq, co-edited by Markus Bouillon and Ben Rowswell (Lynne Rienner, 2007)
 The International Struggle Over Iraq: Politics in the UN Security Council, 1980-2005 (Oxford UP, 2006)
 The UN Security Council From Cold War to Twenty-First Century (Lynne Rienner, 2004)
 Unilateralism and US Foreign Policy, co-edited by Yuen Foong Khong (Lynne Rienner, 2002)
 From Reaction to Conflict Prevention, co-edited by Fen Osler Hampson (Lynne Rienner, 2002)
 Greed and Grievance: Economic Agendas in Civil Wars, co-edited by Mats Berdal, (Lynne Rienner, 2000)
 Decision-Making in the UN Security Council: The Case of Haiti (Oxford UP, 1999)

References

1954 births
Living people
High Commissioners of Canada to India
Ambassadors of Canada to Bhutan
Ambassadors of Canada to Nepal
Permanent Representatives of Canada to the United Nations
Academic staff of United Nations University
Harvard Kennedy School alumni
Scholars of Indian foreign policy
The American University in Cairo alumni
Carnegie Council for Ethics in International Affairs